Euphronia Presbyterian Church is a historic Presbyterian church and national historic district located at 3800 Steel Bridge Road near Sanford, Lee County, North Carolina. It was built in 1886, and is a two-story frame building with weatherboard siding and a gable-fronted nave form.  It features a two-tier belfry rising from the roof ridge.  Also on the property is a contributing church cemetery.

It was listed on the National Register of Historic Places in 1994.

References

Presbyterian churches in North Carolina
Churches on the National Register of Historic Places in North Carolina
Historic districts on the National Register of Historic Places in North Carolina
Churches completed in 1886
19th-century Presbyterian church buildings in the United States
Buildings and structures in Lee County, North Carolina
National Register of Historic Places in Lee County, North Carolina